Premaratne may refer to

Bogoda Premaratne, Sri Lankan educator.
H. D. Premaratne, Sri Lankan Director
L. B. T. Premaratne, Solicitor General of Ceylon
Nilanka Premaratne, Sri Lankan cricketer.
Niroshan Premaratne, Sri Lankan politician
P. L. D. Premaratne, Solicitor General of Ceylon
Rangana Premaratne, actor

Sinhalese surnames